Philip "Phil" Peter Dalhausser (born January 26, 1980) is a Swiss-born American professional beach volleyball player, playing as a blocker. He and his former playing partner, Todd Rogers, were the 2007 AVP Tour and FIVB world champions.

Dalhausser and Rogers dominated both the domestic US tour and now the FIVB international tour winning #1 team honors on both tours in 2010. Dalhausser and Rogers were Olympic gold medalists at the Beijing 2008 Summer Olympics.

Personal life 
Dalhausser was born in Baden, Aargau, Switzerland, to a German father, Peter, and a Swiss mother, Marianne. He now calls his hometown Ventura, California. He attended Mainland High School in Daytona Beach, Florida. Dalhausser did not start playing volleyball until his senior year in high school.

He attended the University of Central Florida and joined Lambda Chi Alpha, where he was named "Most Valuable Player" and received the William G. Morgan Award for most outstanding player. He earned a business degree at UCF and played for the club volleyball team. After college, he worked for a concrete company and then worked a short time for a firm that painted stripes on Florida highways.

In 2011, Dalhausser married Jennifer Corral, who was also a professional beach volleyball player. The couple have two children.

Volleyball career

AVP 
Dalhausser has previously teamed up with Nick Lucena.

At 6'9" (206 cm), Dalhausser led the 2005–2010 AVP tour in blocks.  In 2005 he was sixth in kill percentage.

In 2006, Dalhausser teamed up with Todd Rogers. Rogers, an 11 years veteran of professional beach volleyball, thought he needed someone to help him get to the next level and believed Dalhausser had the potential to become the best player in the world. Rogers plays two roles, both partner and coach to Dalhausser.

In 2007, Dalhausser and Rogers won the Beach Volleyball World Championships in Gstaad, Switzerland, becoming the first U.S. beach team to win the gold medal at the tournament.

Olympics 

Dalhausser qualified for the Beijing 2008 Summer Olympics to represent the United States with his teammate Todd Rogers by being the top seeded American team through the international qualification process.

Dalhausser and Rogers had a record of 6–1 in their first Olympics, being upset in their opening match by 23rd-ranked Latvia. They proceeded to win the rest of their games, coming back from 6–0 in the third set to beat 20th-seeded Switzerland.

Dalhausser and Rogers won the gold medal match two sets to one against Márcio Araújo and Fabio Luiz Magalhães of Brazil. Newly crowned women's beach volleyball champions and compatriots Misty May-Treanor and Kerri Walsh were watching from the stands in the final. Dalhausser made nine blocks in the championship match, with five coming in the deciding third set, putting the US up to a 9–1 lead and eventually winning it 15–4. Dalhausser was named tournament MVP. This made the United States the only country to win gold medals in men's and women's beach volleyball at the same Olympics.

Dalhausser and Rogers failed to defend their gold medal at the London 2012 Summer Olympics. The pair was ousted in the round of 16 by the young Italian team of Paolo Nicolai and Daniele Lupo, losing in straight sets for the first time in their Olympic careers.

Dalhausser paired up with Nick Lucena for the Rio 2016 Summer Olympics, winning their debut match against Tunisia in straight sets.

At the Rio 2016 Summer Olympics, Phil Dalhausser and Nick Lucena made it into the quarterfinals match where they played against Brazil's top-ranked team of 6-foot-8 Alison "The Mammoth" Cerutti and Bruno Oscar Schmidt. There they were eliminated by a 2-1 (21-14, 12–21, 15-9) scoreline, by the hometown's favorite team.

Dalhausser and Lucena made it again to the 2020 Olympics where they finished 9th after a 1-2 against Cherif/Ahmed from Qatar. After the Olympic tournament, Dalhausser decided to retire from professional beach volleyball on the international circuit.

References

External links 

 
  (archive 2008-08-10)
 
 

1980 births
Living people
Beach volleyball players at the 2008 Summer Olympics
Beach volleyball players at the 2012 Summer Olympics
Beach volleyball players at the 2016 Summer Olympics
Olympic beach volleyball players of the United States
Olympic medalists in beach volleyball
Medalists at the 2008 Summer Olympics
Mainland High School alumni
University of Central Florida alumni
Swiss emigrants to the United States
German emigrants to the United States
People from Baden, Switzerland
People from Ormond Beach, Florida
People from Ventura, California
American men's beach volleyball players
Sportspeople from Ventura County, California
Beach volleyball blockers
FIVB World Tour award winners
Beach volleyball players at the 2020 Summer Olympics
Olympic gold medalists for the United States in volleyball